Phillip Abraham Woosnam (22 December 1932 – 19 July 2013) was a Welsh association football inside-right and manager. A native of Caersws, Powys, Wales, Woosnam played for five clubs in England and one in the United States. He played international football for Wales. He was described as a "gifted inside-forward with a pronounced football intelligence".

He was Commissioner of the North American Soccer League from 1969 to 1982, overseeing the league's expansion and boom years. He was inducted into the U.S. National Soccer Hall of Fame in 1997.

Playing career
Woosnam played football with Montgomeryshire Schoolboys and gained youth international honours with Wales, and gained eight amateur caps, the first against England in 1951. While reading Physics, he captained Bangor University's football team at the Welsh Universities' Championship. Woosnam completed his national service with the Royal Artillery. He featured for the Army XI alongside Eddie Colman and Duncan Edwards of Manchester United.

He played club football at Wrexham, Manchester City, Caersws, Aberystwyth Town, and with amateur club Sutton United before he joined Leyton Orient. He made his senior international debut for Wales against Scotland in October 1958, having turned professional in January 1957. He represented the London XI against Lausanne Sports while at Brisbane Road. He was named amateur footballer of the year in 1955.

In November 1958, Woosnam was signed by West Ham United for £30,000 and left his job as a physics teacher at Leyton County High School for Boys to turn professional. He made his debut against Arsenal that month and went on to make 138 league appearances for the club, scoring 26 goals. He made 15 cup appearances, scoring three goals. While at Upton Park, he added 15 full international caps to the one he had gained while at Orient. He also represented the Football League and the Wales Amateurs.

Woosnam moved to Aston Villa in 1962 for a £25,000 fee. He made his Villa debut on 1 December 1962 in a 5–0 home win against Bolton Wanderers. He went on to score 24 goals in 106 League games, and gained a further two international caps.

NASL Commissioner
Woosnam emigrated to the United States in 1966. Although hired as a coach, he played for the Atlanta Chiefs and scored the first goal in the first football game in the Atlanta Fulton County Stadium. Woosnam became coach of the Atlanta Chiefs in 1968, and was named 'Coach of the Year' in 1968. Woosnam became head coach of the United States national team in 1968.

Woosnam was Commissioner of the NASL from 1969 to 1982. He is credited as an important factor in the development of the NASL, and had been a major figure in promoting the league and had secured TV contracts from CBS and ABC. He played a key role during 1970 in recruiting executives at Warner Communications to invest in an expansion team—the New York Cosmos. Woosnam oversaw the westward expansion of NASL in the early 1970s, establishing teams in Los Angeles, the Bay Area, Seattle, and Vancouver. However, he also guided the league into several poor business decisions, such as over-expansion to 24 teams. Facing mounting financial losses, the owners voted to fire Woosnam in 1982.

Woosnam later became managing director of the marketing arm of US Soccer, and helped bring the 1994 World Cup to the US. He was inducted into the US National Soccer Hall of Fame and the Georgia Soccer Hall of Fame in 1997.

Personal
Woosnam, a cousin to golfer Ian Woosnam and a nephew of the English footballer, Max Woosnam, became a naturalized American citizen.

Death
Phil Woosnam died on 19 July 2013 in Dunwoody, Georgia from complications related to prostate cancer and Alzheimer's disease, at the age of 80.

References

1932 births
2013 deaths
Military personnel from Montgomeryshire
People from Montgomeryshire
Sportspeople from Powys
American soccer players
American soccer chairmen and investors
Welsh football managers
Welsh expatriate football managers
Welsh footballers
Welsh expatriate footballers
Wales international footballers
Wrexham A.F.C. players
Manchester City F.C. players
Sutton United F.C. players
Leyton Orient F.C. players
West Ham United F.C. players
Aston Villa F.C. players
Welsh emigrants to the United States
Welsh expatriate sportspeople in the United States
National Professional Soccer League (1967) players
North American Soccer League (1968–1984) players
Expatriate soccer players in the United States
Expatriate soccer managers in the United States
Atlanta Chiefs players
North American Soccer League (1968–1984) coaches
Caersws F.C. players
United States men's national soccer team managers
Alumni of Bangor University
English Football League players
North American Soccer League (1968–1984) commissioners
Royal Artillery personnel
London XI players
Deaths from prostate cancer
Deaths from Alzheimer's disease
Deaths from cancer in Georgia (U.S. state)
Neurological disease deaths in Georgia (U.S. state)
English Football League representative players
Wales amateur international footballers
National Soccer Hall of Fame members
Atlanta Chiefs coaches
Association football forwards
20th-century British Army personnel